

India vs West Indies

Sri Lanka vs New Zealand

Sri Lanka vs West Indies

India vs New Zealand

Sri Lanka vs India

West Indies vs New Zealand

References

External links
 Cricket World Cup 1979 from Cricinfo

Group B, 1979 Cricket World Cup
Cricket World Cup Group B, 1979